The Malaysian Chinese-language edition of Deal or No Deal (Chinese:, pinyin: yī zhí qiān jīn, Jyutping: yat1 zaak6 cin1 gam1) is being aired on ntv7 at 7pm every Monday and Tuesday beginning 12 March 2007. Being the first Mandarin-language version of Deal or No Deal anywhere in the world, it was initially hosted by Goh Wee Ping, who was replaced by Owen Yap in season 2. Prizes range from 10 sen to RM 100,000, hidden  2 cases each held by a "Revlon girl" (i.e. the girls' appearance is sponsored by Revlon).

The second season premiered on May 8, 2008 for 52 episodes.

Preliminary round
In each episode, six contestants join in the preliminary round in which the fastest one to answer two questions correctly progresses into the major "Deal or No Deal" stage.

If at any time the contestant answered a question wrongly, he / she will be out of the game.

Second round
The contestant who won the preliminary round would select one out of 26 cases, hoping that the chosen case has the largest bounty. After that he/she needs to reveal six other cases before hearing the first offer.

The mysterious "Banker" communicates to Wee Ping through a phone, from which he reads out the Banker's offer to the contestant, tempting him/her with the catchphrase  (pinyin:mài huò bú mài, lit. "to deal or not to deal"). As usual, if the contestant chooses not to deal he/she would have to reveal a number of unselected cases still held by the Revlon girls.

But when he/she makes the deal (by pushing a stylized red button enclosed in a glass case), or rejects the final offer with only one unselected case remaining he/she will answer an important question. If he/she answers correctly he/she gets the full amount of cash offered, otherwise he/she would only take 20% of it.

Case values

Models

Case 1: Noemi
Case 2: Miliamina
Case 3: Jane
Case 4: Vivian
Case 5: Daniellikanika-Fiona
Case 6: Nadia
Case 7: Cassie
Case 8: Mei Sze
Case 9: Vivian
Case 10: Yu Lian
Case 11: Velva
Case 12: Yaneki
Case 13: Sharon

Case 14: Nicole
Case 15: Fiona
Case 16: Vina
Case 17: Daniella
Case 18: Tracy
Case 19: Jessica
Case 20: Vivi
Case 21: Ginny
Case 22: Joey
Case 23: Penny
Case 24: Elaine
Case 25: Cassandra
Case 26: Reene

Statistics
Highest Amount Won (Deal): RM 50,000 (3 times)
Appearance: 12 March 2007Cases left: 2 - RM 100,000 and RM10Amount inside the contestant's case: RM10
Appearance: 7 May 2007Cases left: 2 - RM 100,000 and RM50Amount inside the contestant's case: RM50
Appearance: 1 May 2007Cases left: 2 - RM 100,000 and RM750Amount inside the contestant's case: RM750
Highest Amount Won (No Deal): RM 50,000
 Appearance: 31 July 2007 Cases left: 2 - RM 100,000 and RM 50,000Amount inside the contestant's value: RM 50,000
Lowest Amount Won (No Deal):  RM 0.10 
Appearance: 4 June 2007Cases left: 2 - RM 0.10 and RM 5Bank Offer: RM 3 (the lowest offer ever)
Highest Potential Offer: RM 75,000 (Rejected) on 31 July 2007
Highest Potential Offer: RM 82,500 on 2 October 2008 on 2nd Season

See also
Deal or No Deal (Malaysia, English version)

References

External links
Deal or No Deal Malaysia—info in English and Chinese

Deal or No Deal
2007 Malaysian television series debuts
2007 Malaysian television series endings
Malaysian game shows
NTV7 original programming